A sołtys is a head of a sołectwo elected by its permanent citizens in a village meeting (zebranie wiejskie). According to data from 2010, Poland had 40 thousand sołtys, 30.7% of which were women.

Role and powers 
Since 1990, a sołtys is an executive of a sołectwo that is supported by a sołectwo council. The detailed powers, duties and responsibilities of the sołtys are decided in the statute made by the gmina council. The sołtys can use the legal protection of a civil servant in his favour.

Duties 
A sołtys has the duty to:
Represent the sołectwo 
Organise village meetings 
Introduce laws made by the gmina to the sołectwo
Collect taxes 
Participate in gmina council meetings

History 
The office of the sołtys was introduced during the Partitions of Poland. It varied among countries. In Congress Poland, a sołtys was an executive branch of a gromada. He was supposed to guard order in the city. In Congress Poland, a gmina was made up of a few gromadas. In the Grand Duchy of Posen a sołtys usually served the role of a village owner.

In 1934, sołectwa were introduced once again to Poland, which mainly held control over business relating to the people.

In the Polish People's Republic, the role of a sołtys was replaced from 1954 to 1958 with a different position, though it was quickly changed to sołtys. A sołtys was the executive of a village government which, until 1973, ruled a gromada. From 1973 a sołtys governed a sołectwo.

See also 
Schultheiß
Wójt
Wąchock jokes

References 

1868 establishments in Poland
Politics of Poland